Verda Ün (22 November 1919 – 15 February 2011) was a Turkish female classical pianist and piano teacher.

References

1919 births
2011 deaths
Turkish women pianists
Turkish classical pianists
Piano pedagogues
Turkish educators
Burials at Karacaahmet Cemetery